The Mazkeret Batya Silverbacks are an amateur American football team based in Mazkeret Batya, Israel. The Silverbacks compete in the Israel Football League (IFL).

History 

The Silverbacks first played during the 2012–2013 season as the Rehovot Silverbacks. They did not win a single game during their first two seasons and in 2014 they moved to Mazkeret Batya, which is located just five kilometers southeast of Rehovot. They achieved their first ever win in December 2014, when they defeated the Jerusalem Kings.

The Silverbacks reached the playoffs for the first time in 2018 despite only finishing 2-8.

Sponsor 
The Silverbacks were once sponsored by Rose Valley CrossFit in Ness Ziona, Israel.

References 

American football teams in Israel
American football teams established in 2012
2012 establishments in Israel